Scaphiodonichthys is a genus of cyprinid fish found in eastern Asia.  There are currently three described species in this genus.

Species
 Scaphiodonichthys acanthopterus (Fowler, 1934)
 Scaphiodonichthys burmanicus Vinciguerra, 1890
 Scaphiodonichthys macracanthus (Pellegrin & Chevey, 1936)

References
 

Cyprinid fish of Asia
Cyprinidae genera